The Ministry of Housing (Ministerio de la Vivienda - MIVIV) was a department of the Government of Spain responsible for proposing and carrying out the government policy on public housing and urbanism.

This ministry existed in two different periods. The first one was during the dictatorship of Franco. The ministry was first established in 1960. The second one during the democratic period, from 2004 to 2010, when Jose Luis Rodriguez Zapatero announced that the Ministry of Housing would be eliminated.

Its head office was in Madrid.

References

External links
  Arquitectura y política de vivienda - Ministry of Public Works
 Ministry of Housing (Archive)
  Ministry of Housing (Archive)

Spain
Housing
1960 establishments in Spain
Ministries established in 1960
2010 disestablishments in Spain
Ministries disestablished in 2010